Polish Open may refer to:

 Polish Open (badminton), a badminton tournament
 Orange Warsaw Open, a tennis tournament originally known as the Prokom Polish Open
 Polish Open (golf), a golf tournament on the Challenge Tour between 1996 and 1999, known 1998 and 1999 as the Warsaw Golf Open
 Polish Open (tennis), a men's tennis tournament held in Sopot, Poland since 2011
 WTA Poland Open, a women's tennis tournament